Surgeon Vice-Admiral Anthony Leslie Revell CB QHS FRCA (26 April 1935 – 30 December 2018) was a British Royal Navy medical officer and Surgeon General of the British Armed Forces from 1994 to 1997.

References

 

Surgeons-General of the British Armed Forces
1935 births
2018 deaths
Royal Navy vice admirals
Fellows of the Royal College of Anaesthetists
Royal Navy Medical Service officers
Companions of the Order of the Bath